Trams in Miskolc is an important part of the public transport network serving Miskolc, Hungary. In operation since 1897, the network presently has one full tramline and two tramlines that run only on weekends.

History

The need for public transport in Miskolc arose in the second half of the 19th century. The newly built railway line and its station were, at that time, far from the city proper, and even further from the ironworks of the neighbouring town Diósgyőr. The plans for the first tram line were finished in 1895.

The first tram line opened on July 10, 1897 and had eight stops (including the termini) between Tiszai railway station and St. Anne's Church. This route still forms part of both of the current lines. Miskolc was the fourth Hungarian city to have a tram line built, after Budapest (1887), Pozsony (now Bratislava) (1895) and Szombathely (earlier in 1897); it was the second city to have a standard gauge tramway as the ones in Pozsony and Szombathely were narrow gauge.

Due to the success of the east-west line, a north-south line was built before the end of 1897 between Búza tér (the main market of the city) and People's Garden (a popular leisure park). This was extended to the neighbouring village of Hejőcsaba in 1910.

It was only in the early 20th century that the east-west line was extended to reach Diósgyőr. Traffic on the line between St. Anne's Church and Diósgyőr started in 1904. Permission was granted for it to operate not as a city railway but as a suburban railway as it went beyond the administrative border of Miskolc. It was also operated by a different company, the Miskolc-Diósgyőr Municipal Railway Company (MDV Rt.) while the Tiszai station–St. Anne's Church line was operated by the Electric Company of Miskolc (MVV Rt.) This arrangement required passengers to change cars at the church; the resulting inconvenience was solved in 1906 when the two lines were united and management of the Diósgyőr line was taken over by MVV.

Until 1947, the tram operator also ensured the supply of electricity to Miskolc.

After World War II, the city boundaries were shifted further out from the centre; Miskolc became the second largest city in the People's Republic of Hungary.  Heavy industry became important, and public housing was built, adding patronage to the tram and bus lines, the main task of which was delivering workers to factories.

In 1954, MVV was merged with the company responsible for the bus service, under the name Mass Transport Company of Miskolc (MKV).  The north-south line was lifted in 1960, as it could not handle the traffic as effectively as bus routes after new residential areas had been developed. In 1964, the Tiszai station–Diósgyőr line was reconstructed as a double-track line (until then it was single-track).

Network evolution 

During its history the network has had these lines:

 Line 1 (Tiszai station–Felső-Majláth) 1897–
 Started service between Tiszai station and St. Anna square in 1897
 Merged with Diósgyőr Municipal Railway in 1906
 Was called "primary line" until 1951 when it was renamed Line 1
 Extended to Felső-Majláth in 2012
 Diósgyőr Municipal Railway (St. Anna square – Diósgyőr) 1905–1906
 Started service between St. Anna square and Diósgyőr in 1905
 Merged with the primary tram line in 1906
 Line 1A (Tiszai station – Esperanto square) 1958
 Short-lived tram line between Tiszai station and St. Anna square (called Esperanto square then) in 1958
 Line 2 (Szemere street – Hejőcsaba) 1897–1960
 Started service between Búza square and People's Garden in 1897
 Temporarily halted between 1908–1910, cars were redirected to the primary line where there was a shortage of them
 Extended between People's Garden and Hejőcsaba in 1910; Búza square terminus moved to Szemere street
 Was called "secondary line" until 1951 when it was renamed Line 2
 Closed in 1960
 Line 2 (Tiszai station – Vasgyár/Ironworks) 1964–
 Line 3 (Diósgyőr – Vasgyár) 1951–1991
 Line 4 (Bulgárföld – Tatárdomb) 1964–1976
 Line 0 (Újgyőri főtér – Vasgyár) 1970–1989; 2012
 Ran between Marx square (today Újgyőri main square) and Vasgyár between 1970–1989
 Started again in February 2012 but closed in April that year

Current lines

Fleet

Current fleet 
 31 Skoda 26T, low-floor tram
 3 ČKD Tatra KT8D5 (from 18 purchased secondhand from Most and Košice in the 1990s); 1 operates as a historic vehicle, 1 as a Christmas vehicle and the last as a backup.
 1 M5 snowplough.

Heritage fleet 
 1 FVV 1100 vintage tram No. 100, not in regular service (can be frequently seen during the Opera Festival);
 1 FVV 1200 vintage tram No. 151, not in regular service.
 1 SGP E1 + Lohner C3 vintage tram + passenger trailer No. 199 + 300

Past fleet 
 11 FVV 1100 uni-directional tram, with 3 doors, 1962-1989
 10 FVV 1100 bi-directional tram, with 5 doors, 1967-1991
 35 FVV 1200 bi-directional tram, with 10 doors, 1970-2004
 6 Lohner C3 passenger trailers, 2003-2013
 19 SGP E1, uni-directional tram, 2003-2014
 18 ČKD Tatra KT8D5 bi-directional tram, with 10 doors, 1990-

See also

List of town tramway systems in Hungary
List of town tramway systems in Europe

References

Books

External links

 Trams in Miskolc 
 
 

Miskolc
Transport in Miskolc
600 V DC railway electrification
Miskolc